This is a list of places in Sri Lanka with an English name – i.e. names that were originally placenames in England later applied in Sri Lanka by English emigrants and explorers.

Places where the corresponding place name in England is well known

 Abbotsleigh
 Adisham
 Alton
 Atherton
 Beaconsfield
 Blackpool
 Brampton
 Bray
 Carlabeck
 Chelsea
 Dalhousie
 Devon
 Drayton
 Hadley
 Harrow
 Hatherleigh
 Hatton – named after Hatton Garden
 Hayes
 Horton Plains
 Hopton
 Hythe
 Ingestre
 Kenilworth
 King's Lynn
 Kirkoswald
 Marlborough
 Middleton
 Norton
 Norwood
 Orwell
 Preston
 Rushbrook
 Rye
 Sherwood
 Somerset
 Springwood
 Stafford
 Stubbs
 Usk Valley
 Wavenden
 Waverly
 Westhall
 Westward Ho
 Wigton

References

Sri Lanka
Geography of Sri Lanka
British name
Sri Lanka